Jan-Pieter Martens (born 23 September 1974) is a Belgian former footballer who played as a midfielder.

He is currently the team manager at FC Schalke 04.

Honours
Roda JC
KNVB Cup: 1996–97

References

External links
 

1974 births
Living people
Belgian footballers
K.V. Mechelen players
Roda JC Kerkrade players
SK Sturm Graz players
Belgian expatriate footballers
Expatriate footballers in the Netherlands
Belgian expatriate sportspeople in the Netherlands
Expatriate footballers in Austria
Belgian expatriate sportspeople in Austria
Belgian expatriate sportspeople in Germany
Association football midfielders
People from Bilzen
Footballers from Limburg (Belgium)